Cavan–Monaghan is a parliamentary constituency represented in Dáil Éireann, the lower house of the Irish parliament or Oireachtas. The constituency elects 5 deputies (Teachtaí Dála, commonly known as TDs) on the system of proportional representation by means of the single transferable vote (PR-STV).

History and boundaries
It was created under the terms of the Electoral (Amendment) Act 1974 and was first used at the 1977 general election.

The constituency includes the entire area of both County Cavan and County Monaghan, taking in Cavan town, Monaghan town, Clones, Cootehill, Belturbet, Bailieborough, Castleblayney and Carrickmacross. At the 2016 general election, 36 electoral divisions in the west of County Cavan were transferred to the Sligo–Leitrim constituency and Cavan–Monaghan became a 4-seat constituency. This was reversed by the Electoral (Amendment) (Dáil Constituencies) Act 2017, which provided that at the next Irish general election, which took place in 2020, the west of County Cavan would be reunited with the rest of the Cavan–Monaghan constituency, with the addition of territory from County Meath to recreate a 5-seat constituency.

Constituency profile
Cavan–Monaghan is predominantly rural with 75% of the population living outside the main towns. Manufacturing, construction and agriculture are the largest sectors of the local economy. In the 2000s there was an influx of people moving to south-east Cavan from Dublin, benefiting from the low house prices and good transport links to the capital.

Due to its proximity to the border the constituency has historically been strongly Republican; hunger striker Kieran Doherty won a seat in the 1981 general election as an Anti H-Block candidate. In recent elections, the constituency has seen mainly a three-way fight between Fine Gael, Sinn Féin and Fianna Fáil, with the Labour Party traditionally polling poorly.

TDs

Elections

2020 general election

2016 general election

2011 general election

2007 general election
Rory O'Hanlon was Ceann Comhairle at the dissolution of the 29th Dáil and therefore deemed to be returned automatically. The constituency was treated as a four-seater for the purposes of calculating the quota.

2002 general election

1997 general election

1992 general election

1989 general election

1987 general election
Thomas J. Fitzpatrick was Ceann Comhairle at the dissolution of the 24th Dáil and therefore deemed to be returned automatically. The constituency was treated as a four-seater for the purposes of calculating the quota.

November 1982 general election

February 1982 general election

1981 general election

1977 general election

See also
Elections in the Republic of Ireland
Politics of the Republic of Ireland
List of Dáil by-elections
List of political parties in the Republic of Ireland

References

External links
Oireachtas Constituency Dashboards
Oireachtas Members Database

Dáil constituencies
Politics of County Monaghan
Politics of County Cavan
1977 establishments in Ireland
Constituencies established in 1977